Ageneiosus militaris is a species of driftwood catfish of the family Auchenipteridae. It can be found in the La Plata River basin in South America.

References

Bibliography
Eschmeyer, William N., ed. 1998. Catalog of Fishes. Special Publication of the Center for Biodiversity Research and Information, num. 1, vol. 1–3. California Academy of Sciences. San Francisco, California, United States. 2905. .

Ageneiosus
Fish described in 1836
Freshwater fish of Argentina